The Prelinger Library is a privately funded public library in San Francisco founded in 2004 and operated by Megan Prelinger and Rick Prelinger It holds over 50,000 books, periodicals and pieces of print ephemera. Prelinger Library considers itself a "hybrid library" that blurs the distinction between digital and non-digital; as of 2009 it had over 3,700 e-books online.

The library is usually open one and one-half days a week, and hosts approximately 1,000 visitors per year.

Collection 

The library is unusual in that it uses a custom system of organization designed by Megan that intends to facilitate and emphasize browsing. For example, the section on "Suburbia" is next to the section on "Domestic Environments", then "Architecture", which becomes "Graphic Design", which in turn leads to "Typography" and "Fine Arts", and then "Advertising" and "Sales". There is no Dewey Decimal Classification system or card catalog.

The library was inspired in part by the Warburg Institute Library in London, founded by German art historian Aby Warburg. His disciple Fritz Saxl wrote: "The overriding idea was that the books together—each containing its larger or smaller bit of information and being supplemented by its neighbors—should by their titles guide the student to perceive the essential forces of the human mind and its history." Warburg built his library to find connections and relationships between antiquity and the Renaissance. Likewise, the Prelingers' library in part addresses the relationships among intellectual property, the evolution of media and cultural production.

Prelinger is a "serendipity" library, a library that emphasizes the experience of browsing and discovering things that were formerly unknown. The library can also be seen as a counterbalance to modern public libraries, which, as part of digital-library initiatives, emphasize computers and databases and are no longer a "mere warehouse for books". Megan Prelinger said the library is "a local workshop, not an institution. We serve tea, and we encourage photography and scanning and any other form of non-destructive appropriation. That kind of environment is very natural to people in the millennial generation and people who have grown up during the resurgence of craft and DIY spaces."

See also
 Prelinger Archives

Notes

Further reading 

"Classificationist as Author: The Case of the Prelinger Library", by Melanie Feinberg (PDF). Paper to be presented at International Society for Knowledge Organization conference, Montreal, August 2008.
 Megan Prelinger interview at Radio Web MACBA (2015) (Podcast/audio: 40 min)

External links
 
Digitized books from Prelinger Library at Internet Archive

Public libraries in California
Private libraries in the United States
Libraries in San Francisco
2004 establishments in California
Libraries established in 2004